Daniel Henrique Souza de Jesus, usually known as Daniel (born 14 September 1990 in Capão da Canoa, Rio Grande do Sul), is a Brazilian football right back. He currently plays for HB Køge in Danish 1st Division.

References

1990 births
Living people
Sportspeople from Rio Grande do Sul
Brazilian footballers
Sport Club Internacional players
Clube Náutico Capibaribe players
Avaí FC players
Associação Desportiva São Caetano players
Club Athletico Paranaense players
Association football defenders